Bipolar Disorders is a peer-reviewed medical journal covering research on bipolar disorders. It is published 8 times a year by Wiley-Blackwell and is an official journal of the International Society for Bipolar Disorders. The journal was established in 1999 and the editors-in-chief are K.N. Roy Chengappa and Gin S. Malhi (Western Psychiatric Institute & Clinic).

Abstracting and indexing 
The journal is abstracted and indexed in:

According to the Journal Citation Reports, the journal has a 2021 impact factor of 6.744.

References

External links 
 

Psychiatry journals
Wiley-Blackwell academic journals
Publications established in 1999
English-language journals